George Moffatt (August 13, 1787 – February 25, 1865) was a businessman and political figure in Lower Canada and Canada East (now Quebec). Born in England, he emigrated to Lower Canada at the age of 14.  He became involved in business in Montreal, including the fur trade.

Moffatt was involved in the municipal politics of Montreal, and in 1830 was appointed to the Legislative Council of Lower Canada.  Following the Lower Canada Rebellion of 1837–1838, he was appointed to the Executive Council of Lower Canada and the Special Council of Lower Canada, an appointed body that took the place of the Parliament of Lower Canada, which was suspended.  

After the union of Lower Canada with Upper Canada, Moffatt was elected to the Legislative Assembly of the Province of Canada, as one of two members for Montreal.  He resigned his seat in 1842 to protest the proposal to move the seat of government from Kingston to Montreal, but was re-elected in the general election of 1844.  He did not stand for election in the general election of 1848.

Moffatt continued in his business activities for the rest of his life.  He died in Montreal in 1865.

Early life
Moffatt was born in Sidehead, Weardale, County Durham, England in 1787.  After a brief period of studies in London, Moffatt emigrated to Lower Canada in 1801 at the age of 14, under the sponsorship of John Ogilvy. After further studies at William Henry (now Sorel), he joined Ogilvy's firm, which was part of the XY Company, involved in the fur trade. He later joined McTavish, McGillivray and Company, part of a rival fur-trading company, the North West Company.

Moffatt made various trips to the northwest as part of the fur trade.  At one point he married an Indigenous woman in a common law relationship, by whom he had one son around 1809.  Relationships of this type were common in the fur trading community, and were termed marriage à la façon du pays or "marriage according to the custom of the country".  Moffatt brought his son, Lewis, back to Montreal with him.  Lewis Moffatt became a well-respected businessman in Upper Canada.

Moffatt served in the Montreal militia during the War of 1812, under the command of Lieutenant Colonel Charles de Salaberry.

In 1816, Moffatt married Sophia MacRae in Montreal. The couple had three sons.

Business career
In 1811, Moffatt started a new firm, which eventually became Gillespie, Moffatt, and Company.  The partnership dealt in import-export trade, marine transport, and insurance.  The firm became a major supply house associated with the North West Company, but Moffatt continued to have business connections with the rival Hudson's Bay Company  In 1815 and 1816, he helped Colin Robertson, a trader for the HBC, during his expeditions to the Athabaska country. Moffatt helped bring stability to the fur trade in Canada by helping to smooth the way for the merger of the North West Company and the HBC in 1821.

In the meantime, his company had expanded into a wider range of imports and exports.  By 1821, Gillespie, Moffatt and Company was the largest import-export business in Montreal, with extensive premises in the harbour, as well as owning their own ship.  Moffatt's eldest son, Lewis, eventually moved to Toronto, Upper Canada, and opened a successful branch office of the firm. The company was also Canadian agents for the Phoenix Fire Assurance Company.  By 1845, they developed a large portfolio of insured properties in Montreal.  An inspector for the British parent company reported favourably in 1846 on Moffatt's judgment in assessing risks in Montreal.

Outside the partnership, Moffatt also had significant business activities on his own behalf, investing in real estate, settlement in the Eastern Townships, railway construction, mining, and banking.  He was an investor and promoter in the Champlain and St. Lawrence Railroad, the first public railway in Canada, as well as the St. Lawrence and Atlantic Railroad, connecting Montreal to the ice-free harbour of Portland, Maine.  He was an early director of the Bank of Montreal.  In 1822 he was a founding member of the Montreal Committee of Trade.  By 1844, he was President of its successor, the Montreal Board of Trade.

One of Moffatt's major interests, both as a businessman and later in the Legislative Assembly, was the improvement of the Montreal harbour.  In 1831 he was chosen the chair of the Montreal Harbour Commission, and was heavily involved in projects to improve the harbour.

Political career

Lower Canada 

In the early 1830s, Moffat was active in Montreal municipal politics.  In 1830, he was appointed to the Legislative Council of Lower Canada, the upper house of the Parliament of Lower Canada. He was one of the leaders of the English "constitutionalist" party in the Montreal area, and contributed to the decisions of the Legislative Council to reject bills sent up by the elected Legislative Assembly of Lower Canada, which had a large French-Canadian majority.  He also contributed to the political tensions by bringing criminal charges against the editors of two newspapers who had published articles criticising the Legislative Council, Ludger Duvernay and  Daniel Tracey.  Their imprisonment and release after numerous protests contributed to the hihg tensions in the 1832 election, in which Tracey was a candidate.  In his capacity as a magistrate, Moffatt requested the aid of British troops to maintain order at the polls.  Three of Tracey's supporters were killed.  Moffatt was likely was one of the behind-the-scenes originators of a series of venomous anti-French letters which were published in the Montreal Herald in the summer of 1835, opposing the British government's attempts at conciliation with French-Canadians in Lower Canada.

In the fall of 1837, in the run-up to the Rebellion, Moffatt travelled to London with William Badgley, also from Montreal, to explain the political situation in Lower Canada and the position of the "British Party". While they were there, in November 1837 the Rebellion broke out. They met with the Colonial Secretary, Lord Glenelg. Moffatt recommended moderation in dealing with the rebels, suggesting banishment of only a few of the most serious cases. Moffatt and Badgley also met with the new Governor General, Lord Durham and prepared a detailed memorandum for him, giving their views on issues that needed to be addressed. They also provided a letter advising against an elected Legislative Council, which was one of the grievances raised by the Legislative Assembly. Moffatt travelled back to Lower Canada with Durham, and proposed a Political_union#Academic_analysis legislative union] of the two Canadas to Durham.
 
Moffatt served in the Legislative Council until 1838, when the Parliament was suspended as a result of the Rebellion. He was named to the special council that governed the province after the rebellion.

Province of Canada

In 1841, he was elected to the Legislative Assembly of the Province of Canada as one of two members for the city of Montreal as a Conservative member; he resigned in 1843 to protest the movement of the capital from Kingston to Montreal but was reelected in 1844. Although initially opposing the use of French in the assembly, he later supported a motion by Denis-Benjamin Papineau to reinstate the use of French as an official language in parliament. Moffatt helped develop the harbour facilities at Montreal.

He was chairman of the short-lived British American League at Montreal, which developed in response to the annexation movement in Canada East.

Later life and death

After leaving politics, Moffatt continued his business activities in Montreal, particularly in banking and railways, part of a period of rapid economic changes and development.  

He died in Montreal in 1865.

References

1787 births
1865 deaths
Members of the Legislative Council of Lower Canada
Members of the Special Council of Lower Canada
Members of the Legislative Assembly of the Province of Canada from Canada East
Anglophone Quebec people
Directors of Bank of Montreal
Pre-Confederation Canadian businesspeople
Pre-Confederation Quebec people
Businesspeople from Montreal
Politicians from Montreal